"Purge" is a song by American singer Willow featuring American singer Siiickbrain. It was released on April 1, 2022, through Roc Nation.

Background and release 

In February 2022, Willow partnered with American singer and rapper Machine Gun Kelly, releasing "Emo Girl", a single from Kelly's album Mainstream Sellout. "Purge" was released on April 1, through Roc Nation.

Composition 
"Purge" is a pop-punk and rock song which has been described as an aggressive, high-energy, "screamo-tinged" track. It reminded journalist Emily Zemler of the 2000s. Several publications noted that the song was Willow's most heavy song to date.

Music video 
The music video for "Purge", self-directed by Willow, was uploaded to YouTube a week prior to the song's release on other music streaming platforms.

Synopsis 
In the clip, the two artists move around a warehouse with low light levels. Willow applies a tattoo to the face of Siiickbrain. The two sing and yell into each others' faces, and kiss in a car. After kissing, the duo destroys the car they were inside of using baseball bats.

Reception 
Zemler remarked that, though the clip was most likely filmed prior to the Will Smith–Chris Rock slapping incident, where the latter was slapped by the former, the clip felt like a "pointed statement" directed at Rock due to the two singers "showcas[ing their] shaven heads", as if it was meant to be a response to Rock's jokes about Jada Pinkett Smith's baldness. Brenton Blanchet called the music video a "good time".

Credits 
Credits are adapted from Spotify.

 Willow Smith – performer, songwriter
 Siiickbrain – performer, songwriter
 No Love for the Middle Child – producer

Release history

References 

2022 singles
2022 songs
American pop punk songs
Songs written by Willow Smith
Willow Smith songs